The Arcade Hotel (also known as the Shaw Arcade or Howard Hotel) is a historic hotel in Tarpon Springs, Florida, United States. It is located at 210 South Pinellas Avenue. On January 12, 1984, it was added to the U.S. National Register of Historic Places. Several guests had stayed there throughout the 1930s and committed suicide in the hotel after Black Tuesday, the beginning of the Great Depression. The building now houses several shop. It is located on alt. 19 in Tarpon Springs Florida, near the historic downtown.

References

External links
 Pinellas County listings at National Register of Historic Places
 Florida's Office of Cultural and Historical Programs
 Pinellas County listings
 Arcade Hotel

Gallery

Hotels in Florida
Buildings and structures in Tarpon Springs, Florida
Hotel buildings on the National Register of Historic Places in Florida
Arcade Hotel (Tarpon Spring, Florida)
Companies based in Pinellas County, Florida
Mission Revival architecture in Florida
Spanish Colonial Revival architecture in Florida
1926 establishments in Florida
Hotel buildings completed in 1926